Rishad Pazhaya Puthanveettil (born 6 July 1995) is an Indian professional footballer who plays as a midfielder for I-League club Gokulam Kerala.

Club career

Gokulam Kerala
On 7 August 2020, Rishad joined I-League club Gokulam Kerala on a two-year contract. He made his debut for the club in the 2021 Durand Cup, on 12 September 2021, against Army Red, which ended in a 2–2 draw, coming on as a 39th-minute substitute. On 3 March 2022, he made his I-League debut, against NEROCA, which ended in a 0–0 stalemate.

At the 2022 AFC Cup group-stage opener, Rishad and his side achieved a historic 4–2 win against Indian Super League side ATK Mohun Bagan, in which he scored a goal.

Career statistics

Club

Honours
'''Gokulam Kerala
 I-League: 2021–22

References

Living people
1995 births
People from Malappuram district
Indian footballers
Footballers from Kerala
Association football midfielders
I-League players
I-League 2nd Division players
Gokulam Kerala FC players